György László "Gyuszi" Balint (born March 29, 1979) is a Romanian football manager and former player, who is currently in charge of Liga I club UTA Arad.

Career
Balint was born in Brașov, Romania, into an ethnic Hungarian family. In his early career as a footballer, he played for Rapid Energia Braşov, Romradiatoare Braşov, before joining FC Brașov in 2001, where he played for four seasons in Liga I. After the club's relegation he moved to CFR Cluj, under player-coach Dorinel Munteanu, reaching with his new club into the Intertoto Cup finals of 2005. The following season, he transferred to another Liga I club, UTA Arad. In 2007, he is brought by Dan Petrescu into the squad of Unirea Urziceni, a team that would gain its first championship title in history two years later. After that, followed a short spell at Diósgyőr in the Hungarian First Division, before signing as a player-manager for Unirea Tărlungeni in the Romanian Liga III, a club near his hometown of Braşov. Under his management, Unirea Tărlungeni promoted for the first time in history in the Romanian Liga II. After coaching Unirea Tărlungeni for a year in Romanian Liga II în January 2015 was employed by FC Brașov as assistant coach for the second part of the 2014-2015 Romanian Liga I, followed by an employment as head-coach at Academica Clinceni in the Romanian Liga II. In June 2017, he was appointed as head-coach at Târgu Mureș, team that has relegated from the Romanian Liga I to the Romanian Liga II, where he spent only 3 months, resigning after the 6th match in the league, when ASA 2013 Târgu Mureș was sitting 3rd in the table. After his short spell at Târgu Mureș he took over the management of FK Miercurea Ciuc, finishing second at the end of the 2017–2018 season of Liga III, highest ranking in the club history. In June 2018, he accepted the offer from Sportul Snagov, team that finished 10th in the 2017–2018 season of Liga II, and under his command, the team becomes the biggest surprise of the competition, finishing the first part of the 2018–2019 season at the top of the table. Because of the financial problems that Sportul Snagov is struggling with, Gyuszi decides to leave the club in January 2019, along with many important players. Currently, he is in charge of UTA Arad. He arrived at Arad in 2019, with great ambitions and a long-term project. Under his command, UTA won the Liga II at the end of 2019/2020 season and now is playing in Liga I.

Honours

Player
CFR Cluj
UEFA Intertoto Cup runner-up: 2005
Unirea Urziceni
Cupa României runner-up: 2007–08

Manager
Unirea Tărlungeni
Liga III: 2012–13
UTA Arad
Liga II: 2019–20

Career statistics

Managerial

References

External links

1979 births
Living people
Romanian sportspeople of Hungarian descent
Sportspeople from Brașov
Romanian footballers
Association football defenders
Liga I players
Liga II players
Liga III players
FC Brașov (1936) players
CFR Cluj players
FC UTA Arad players
FC Unirea Urziceni players
ACF Gloria Bistrița players
Nemzeti Bajnokság I players
Diósgyőri VTK players
CS Unirea Tărlungeni players
Romanian expatriate footballers
Expatriate footballers in Hungary
Romanian expatriate sportspeople in Hungary
Romanian football managers
LPS HD Clinceni managers
ASA 2013 Târgu Mureș managers
FK Csíkszereda Miercurea Ciuc managers
CS Sportul Snagov managers
FC Metaloglobus București managers
FC UTA Arad managers
CS Universitatea Craiova managers
Liga I managers
Liga II managers